

The SITAR GY-100 Bagheera (named after Bagheera, a character in Rudyard Kipling's The Jungle Book) was a light aircraft designed and built in France in the late 1960s. Designed by Yves Gardan, it was a low-wing, cantilever monoplane of conventional layout with fixed, tricycle undercarriage. The fully enclosed cabin had seating for up to four people in 2+2 configuration. Construction was of metal throughout.

Type certification was granted in 1971,  and Gardan hoped to market the Bagheera through his company, SITAR. However, with the oil crisis looming and after the prototype disintegrated in flight, Gardan abandoned development.  Only two examples were built.

Specifications

Notes

References
 
 
 
 
 
 
 
 

1960s French civil utility aircraft
SITAR aircraft
Single-engined tractor aircraft
Low-wing aircraft
Aircraft first flown in 1967